The South and Central American Men's Youth Handball Championship is the official competition for Youth national handball teams of South America and Central America, and takes place every two years. In addition to crowning the South and Central American junior champions, the tournament also serves as a qualifying tournament for the World Junior Handball Championship. The first tournament was held in 2019 in Taubaté, Brasil.

Summaries

Medal table

Participating nations

References

External links
Official website

 
Men's sports competitions in South America
Recurring sporting events established in 2019